15P may refer to:

 15P/Finlay, a comet
 SpaceShipOne flight 15P, a commercial spaceflight
Phosphorus (15P), a chemical element

See also
 P15 (disambiguation)